Denise Lopez may refer to:

Denise Lopez (American singer), American singer and A&M Records artist in late 1980s/early 1990s
Denise Lopez (Swedish singer), Swedish singer and DJ